
Gmina Rakszawa is a rural gmina (administrative district) in Łańcut County, Subcarpathian Voivodeship, in south-eastern Poland.

Villages
Gmina Rakszawa contains the villages and settlements of Kąty Rakszawskie, Rakszawa, Węgliska and Wydrze.

Neighbouring gminas
Gmina Rakszawa is bordered by the gminas of Czarna, Leżajsk, Sokołów Małopolski and Żołynia.

References

Polish official population figures 2006

Rakszawa
Łańcut County